The Barbuda Democratic Movement was a political party in Antigua and Barbuda. It contested the general elections in 1960 and 1989, but on both occasions received fewer than 160 votes and failed to win a seat.

References

Defunct political parties in Antigua and Barbuda
Barbuda political parties
Political parties with year of establishment missing
Political parties with year of disestablishment missing